A precept (from the , to teach) is a commandment, instruction, or order intended as an authoritative rule of action.

Religious law
In religion, precepts are usually commands respecting moral conduct.

Christianity

The term is encountered frequently in the Jewish and Christian Scriptures:

The usage of precepts in the Revised Standard Version of the Bible corresponds with that of the Hebrew Bible. The Septuagint (Samuel Rengster edition) has Greek entolas, which, too, may be rendered with precepts.

Latin Catholicism

The Latin Church of the Catholic Church's canon law, which is based on Roman Law, makes a distinction between precept and law in Canon 49:

In Catholicism, the "Commandments of the Church" may also be called "Precepts of the Church".

Buddhism

In Buddhism, the fundamental code of ethics is known as the Five Precepts (Pañcaśīla in Sanskrit, or Pañcasīla in Pāli), practiced by laypeople, either for a given period of time or for a lifetime. The precepts also relate to right speech, action and livelihood aspects of the Noble Eightfold Path, which is essential in Buddhist practices. There are other levels of precepts, varying amongst traditions. In Theravadin tradition, there are Eight Precepts, Ten Precepts, and the Patimokkha. Eight Precepts are a more rigorous practice for laypeople. Ten Precepts are the training rules for samaneras and samaneris, novice monks and nuns, respectively. The Patimokkha is the basic Theravada code of monastic discipline, consisting of 227 rules for monks, (bhikkhus) and 311 rules for nuns (bhikkhunis).

Secular law
In secular law, a precept is a command in writing; a species of writ issued from a court or other legal authority. It is now chiefly used of an order demanding payment (in the UK, for example, the term is applied by local precepting authorities as part of the Council Tax system). The Latin form praecipe (i.e., to enjoin, command) is used of the note of instructions delivered by a plaintiff or his lawyer to be filed by the officer of the court, giving the names of the plaintiff and defendant.

Higher education
Princeton University uses the term precept to describe what many other universities refer to as recitations: large classes are often divided into several smaller discussion sections called precepts, which are led by the professor or graduate teaching assistants. Precepts or recitations usually meet once a week to supplement the lectures and provide a venue for discussion of the course material.

See also
 Five precepts  (Taoism)
 Ten precepts (Taoism)
 Preceptor

References

Bibliography

Article entolē in Exegetical Dictionary of the New Testament, H. Balz and G. Schneider (ed.), Edinburgh 1990, Vol. I, pp. 459–60, which also cites sources for a discussion of the term's distinction from Greek nomos/"law".
 The Code of Canon Law, 1983, in the English translation prepared by the Canon Law Society of Great Britain and Ireland 
The Oxford English Dictionary lists the origin of precept as from the Latin roots of pre-septum. Thus precept is a pre coming-together/closure.

Statements
Canon law of the Catholic Church